Gbagbongom is the biggest settlement in Mbajor in Vandeikya Local Government Area of Benue State, North-Central Nigeria. It is located between latitude 7°5' and 7°15' north of the Equator and Longitude 9° and 9°6' east of Greenwich. The population is around 5,000, mostly Tiv people who are predominantly farmers. Common agricultural produce from here include: ground-nuts, citrus, yam, cassava, sweet potatoes, maize, guinea corn, tomatoes and pepper. 

The climate is tropical sub-humid with the mean annual rainfall of between 1,200 and 2,000 mm (47" and 79") averaging seven months in the year, while the mean annual temperature is 32.5 °C (90 °F). The wet season is from April to October or November while the dry season is November to March.

Gbagbongom has a traditional Market which dates back to 1930. The market is a periodic one holding every 5 days, on the same day as Agbo - Vandeikya, Lessel and Ushongu markets. Its people are very warm, and predominantly Christians with few traditionalists. Great traditional rulers like Late Ikyekye Gbuushu and Late Anger Abanyi hailed from here. It is renowned for the popular Kwagh-Hir festival in the late 1980s.  Gbagbongom also has a functional Police Station for the security of the settlement.

There is a big Catholic church in the area, St Andrew's Catholic Church Gbagbongom under the Catholic Diocese of Gboko, an NKST (Nongu u Kristu u i Ser u sha Tar) Church Kor, as well as small Pentecostal churches. In June 2018, the Bishop of the catholic Diocese of Gboko, Most Revd Dr. William A. Avenya, paid a pastoral visit to Gbagbongom.

The settlement has no major industries; although there are few small scale cottage industries such as rice milling, corn milling, block making (burnt bricks) and furniture works. 

Populated places in Benue State